This article is a list of notable individuals who were born in and/or have lived in Wheat Ridge, Colorado.

Arts and entertainment
Robert Adams (1937- ), photographer
Dean Reed (1938–1986), actor, director, singer, and songwriter
Nick Stabile (1971- ), actor

Business
Tim Gill (1953- ), co-founder of Quark, Inc. and LGBT rights activist
Bill Harmsen (1912–2002), candy maker, art collector, and co-founder of the Jolly Rancher Candy Company
Dorothy Harmsen (1914–2006), candy maker, art collector, and co-founder of the Jolly Rancher Candy Company

Crime
Cassie Bernall (1981–1999), victim of the Columbine High School massacre

Politics

National
Troy Eid (1963- ), U.S. Attorney for Colorado
Roy H. McVicker (1924–1973), U.S. Representative from Colorado
Daniel Schaefer (1936–2006), U.S. Representative from Colorado

State
Jessie Danielson (1978- ), Colorado state legislator
Cheri Jahn (1953- ), Colorado state legislator
Sue Schafer, Colorado state legislator

Sports

American football
Ray Johnson (1914–1990), defensive back, tailback
Terry Kunz (1952- ), running back
Dave Logan (1954- ), wide receiver, coach, radio and television host

Baseball
Mark Johnson (1975- ), MLB catcher
Mark Melancon (1985- ), Relief pitcher for the San Francisco Giants

Bodybuilding
Heather Armbrust (1977- ), IFBB professional bodybuilder
Phil Heath (1979- ), American IFBB professional bodybuilder and current Mr. Olympia

Cycling
Linda Brenneman (1965- ), U.S. Olympic cyclist
Ron Kiefel (1960- ), professional cyclist and Olympic medalist

Soccer
Aleisha Cramer (1982- ), midfielder
Paolo DelPiccolo (1991- ), midfielder
Todd Dunivant (1980- ), defender for the MLS side Los Angeles Galaxy
Bill Sedgewick (1971- ), defender, midfielder

Other
Pat Frink (1945–2012), NBA player (Cincinnati Royals)

References

Wheat Ridge, Colorado
Wheat Ridge
People from Wheat Ridge, Colorado